The men's 4 × 100 metres relay event at the 1987 Summer Universiade was held at the Stadion Maksimir in Zagreb on 18 and 19 July 1987.

Results

Heats

Final

References

Athletics at the 1987 Summer Universiade
1987